"Call Me" is the fourth single from British R&B singer Jamelia and the third single from her debut album, Drama (2000). Released on 12 June 2000, "Call Me" followed "Money" into the UK top 20, peaking at  11. The song spent five weeks on the UK Singles Chart.

Track listings

UK CD1
 "Call Me" (radio edit)
 "Call Me" (Goodfellas' Rising mix)
 "Big Girl"
 "Call Me" (enhanced video)

UK CD2
 "Call Me" (radio edit)
 "Call Me" (Jonuz Deep Cover mix)
 "Call Me" (Capital T Feelgood mix)
 "Call Me" (Messy Boy's vocal mix)

UK cassette single
 "Call Me" (radio edit)
 "Call Me" (Goodfellas' Rising mix)
 "Call Me" (Capital T Feelgood mix)

Credits and personnel
Credits are taken from the UK CD1 liner notes.

Recording
 Recorded at Xosa Studios (Weymouth, Dorset, UK)
 Mixed at Enterprise Studios (Burbank, California, US)

Personnel
 Jamelia – vocals, background vocals, writing
 Daniel de Bourg – background vocals
 Emmanuel – keyboards, production, programming
 Dave Pensado – mixing
 Dylan Dresdow – mixing assistant
 Phil Byrne – management
 Peacock – art direction and design
 Mike Diver – photography

Charts

References

2000 singles
2000 songs
Jamelia songs
Music videos directed by Jake Nava
Parlophone singles
Songs written by Jamelia